Meat floss, also known as rousong, yuk sung, or bak hu, is a dried meat product with a light and fluffy texture similar to coarse cotton, originating from China.

Culinary use
Meat floss is used as a decorative and flavoring topping for many foods, such as congee, tofu, rice, and savory soy milk. It is also used as filling for various savory buns and pastries as well as a topping for baked goods filled with bean paste, for example, or as a snack food on its own. Meat floss is a popular food item in Chinese, Vietnamese (called ruốc in the North, and chà bông in the South), and Indonesian dining.

Production and styles
Meat floss is made by stewing finely cut pork, chicken, or beef (though other meats may be used) in a sweetened mixture of soy sauce and various spices until individual muscle fibres can be easily torn apart with a fork. This happens when the water-insoluble collagen that holds the muscle fibres of the meat together has been converted into water-soluble gelatine. The meat is teased apart, strained, and partially dried in the oven. It is then mashed and beaten while being cooked in a large wok until it is nearly completely dry. Additional flavourings are usually added while the mixture is being fried. 

There are two styles of meat floss, which differ in whether oil is added during the last process of production.

Variations

A very similar product is pork fu (pinyin: ròufǔ), which is less fried and less shredded than meat floss, and has a more fibrous texture.

Fish can also be made into floss (魚鬆; yú sōng), though initial stewing is not required due to the low collagen and elastin content of fish meat. Rabbit and duck floss can also be found in China.

In Japan, a variant made from fish is called .

In Muslim-majority Indonesia and Malaysia, beef or chicken floss is the most popular variant, and is commonly called abon in Indonesian and serunding in Malay. In Malaysia, serunding is a popular delicacy during Ramadan and Eid al-Fitr.

In the Muslim-majority Hausa cuisine of Northern Nigeria, dambu nama is a dry, shredded beef snack, similar to meat floss. It is fried and heavily spiced in its preparation.

Health effects
A study has demonstrated a positive correlation between increased processing temperatures of meat floss and increased formation of heterocyclic aromatic amines (HAAs) within the meat. Up to seven different HAAs were found when meat floss was processed at 150 °C.  HAAs are believed to promote the development of some cancers.

See also

 Serundeng
 Dried shredded squid
 Bakkwa
 List of dried foods
 Machaca
 Pulled pork
 Čvarci
Pemmican
Katsuobushi

References

Chinese cuisine
Indonesian cuisine
Singaporean cuisine
Malaysian cuisine
Cambodian cuisine
Vietnamese cuisine
Taiwanese cuisine
Macau cuisine
Hong Kong cuisine
Dried meat
Pork